The 2019 North Dakota Fighting Hawks football team represented the University of North Dakota during the 2019 NCAA Division I FCS football season. Led by sixth-year head coach Bubba Schweigert, they played their home games at the Alerus Center. They finished the season 7–5. They received an at-large bid to the FCS Playoffs, where they would lose to Nicholls in the first round.

The Fighting Hawks left the Big Sky Conference in 2018 to join the non-football Summit League, with the football program joining the Missouri Valley Football Conference in 2020. Although being classified as an independent for football in 2018 and 2019, they continued to play a full Big Sky schedule, and their games counted in the conference standings for their opponents. The Fighting Hawks were ineligible to win the conference championship.

Previous season

The Fighting Hawks finished the 2018 season with a record of 6–5.

Schedule

Game summaries

Drake

at North Dakota State

Sam Houston State

at Eastern Washington

UC Davis

at Idaho State

at Cal Poly

Montana State

at Weber State

Northern Colorado

Southern Utah

FCS Playoffs
The Fighting Hawks were selected for the postseason tournament, with a first-round pairing against Nicholls.

at Nicholls–First Round

Ranking movements

References

North Dakota
North Dakota Fighting Hawks football seasons
North Dakota
North Dakota Fighting Hawks football